Richard L. DiNardo is an author and historian. He authored books about significant events in the 19th and 20th centuries, such as World War I, World War II, and other related events. He has worked with other author-historians, such as Daniel J. Hughes, Albert A. Nofi, David Syrett and Williamson Murray.

Books 
James Longstreet: The Man, The Soldier, The Controversy (1988)
Germany's Panzer Arm in World War II (1997)
Mechanized Juggernaut Or Military Anachronism? Horses and the German Army of World War II (1991)
Germany and The Axis powers from Coalition and Collapse (2005)
Breakthrough: The Gorlice-Tarnow Campaign, 1915 (2010)
Invasion: The Conquest of Serbia 1915 (2015)
 Turning Points: The Eastern Front in 1915 (2020)

References 

Historians of World War I
Living people
Year of birth missing (living people)